African American Museum is an American art museum located at 3536 Grand Avenue in Fair Park, Dallas, Texas. The museum was founded in 1974 and has operated independently since 1979. The 7 million dollar structure which is now its home, was funded through private donations, and a 1985 Dallas city bond election, which provided 1.2 million towards its construction. The  structure, built in the shape of a cross, is made of ivory-colored stone. Natural materials and design motifs are used throughout the museum in a manner reminiscent of pre-industrialized cultures of the African continent.

History

The African American Museum of Dallas was established in 1974 as a part of the Special Collections at Bishop College, a historically black college which closed in 1988. The Museum has operated independently since 1979. The $7 million edifice was funded through private donations and a 1985 Dallas City bond election that provided $1.2 million for the construction of the new facility. The Museum is the only one of its kind in the Southwestern United States devoted to the preservation and display of African American artistic, cultural and historical materials. It also boasts having one of the largest African American Folk Art collections in the U.S.

The Museum's operators say they strive to present a meaningful experience to children and adults who do not normally visit art museums. The museum houses a rich heritage of American art and history in four vaulted galleries that are augmented by a research library. The Museum's permanent collections include African art; African American art; magazine, historical, political, and community archives. Visitors can also experience African American culture through many educational and entertaining programs that are frequently presented in an "educational plaza", which includes a theater and classrooms.

Collections

The current museum building occupies virtually the same site as the Texas Centennial Exposition's Hall of Negro Life. It boasts a permanent collection that consists of the works of such highly regarded African American artists as Romare Bearden, Jacob Lawrence, Larry D. Alexander, John T. Biggers, Clementine Hunter, Benny Andrews, Edward Mitchell Bannister, and Arthello Beck.

Further reading
 "Dallas and Fort Worth:A Pictorial Celebration" by Michael W. Duty
 "Dallas and Fort Worth Alive" by Kimberly Young
 "Marmac Guide to Dallas" by Yves Gerem

References

External links 
 African American Museum Official Website

Museums in Dallas
Art museums and galleries in Texas
Art museums established in 1974
Arts in Dallas
1974 establishments in Texas
African-American museums in Texas
Fair Park